This is a list of the National Register of Historic Places listings in Upshur County, Texas.

This is intended to be a complete list of properties listed on the National Register of Historic Places in Upshur County, Texas. There are two properties listed on the National Register in the county. One property is also a Recorded Texas Historic Landmark.

Current listings

The locations of National Register properties may be seen in a mapping service provided.

|}

See also

National Register of Historic Places listings in Texas
Recorded Texas Historic Landmarks in Upshur County

References

External links

Upshur County, Texas
Upshur County
Buildings and structures in Upshur County, Texas